Brójce  is a village in the administrative district of Gmina Trzciel, within Międzyrzecz County, Lubusz Voivodeship, in western Poland.

The village has a population of 1,050.

External links 
 Jewish Community in Brójce on Virtual Shtetl

References

Villages in Międzyrzecz County